The , or , is a Japanese group of four men who perform dangerous and crude stunts.

The group was formed in Tokyo in 1990. The Tokyo Shock Boys have a huge cult following in Japan and have appeared in many other countries, such as Australia, New Zealand, Canada, Germany and Scotland.

In 2006, they made appearances in Japanorama, Adam & Joe go Tokyo and the Dirty Sanchez movie. However, their shows are viewed as having more 'magic' stunts rather than painful ones. This was proven in Dirty Sanchez: The Movie as the Tokyo Shock Boys refused to do a show with Dirty Sanchez because they viewed their stunts to be too extreme.

The members of the group are:

See also

 The Dudesons
 Jackass
 CKY
 Too Stupid to Die
 Les 11 commandements
 Jim Rose Circus

References

External links
Homepage of the Tokyo Shock Boys 

Japanese comedy troupes
Japanese stunt performers